Kisna Diamond Jewellery is an Indian diamond brand launched in 2005 by H.K.Jewels, which is the part of Hari Krishna Group Company. Kisna includes 1877 Designs in rings for men and women, earrings, pendants, necklace, bangles, bracelets, solitaire rings and nose pins.
Recently, Kisna received the brand of year award by GIF.

History
Kisna was started as the flagship diamond and jewellery brand of Hari Krishna Exports in 2005.

Awards
 In December, 2013, Kisna was awarded the Jewellery Brand of the Year by the Indian Jewellers (IJ) Choice Design Awards.
 On 21 February, Kisna was awarded Paramparik (Traditional) Jewellery Of The Year 2014 by GJF’s National Jewellery Awards.

References 

new kisna diamond jewellery logo
https://cdn.shopify.com/s/files/1/0621/0745/1571/files/2_df8aedf4-8982-4aaa-91f9-95f01ef843ad_140x.jpg

External links 
 http://www.kisna.com Kisna Diamond jewellery

Luxury brands
Companies based in Mumbai
Indian brands
Diamond industry in India
2005 establishments in Maharashtra
Indian companies established in 2005